Rick Rubin is an American record producer who holds eight Grammy Awards, including Album of the Year which he won with the Dixie Chicks and Adele in 2007 and 2012, respectively. He has also won numerous producer of the year awards. This is a list compiling his production discography.

1980s 

 1981: The Pricks – The Pricks
 1983: Hose – Hose
 1984: T La Rock & Jazzy Jay – "It's Yours"
 1984: LL Cool J – "I Need a Beat"
 1985: Beastie Boys – "Rock Hard"
 1985: Run-DMC – King of Rock (mixing)
 1985: Jazzy Jay – "Def Jam/Cold Chillin' in the Spot"
 1985: Jimmy Spicer – "This Is It / Beat the Clock"
 1985: Hollis Crew – "It's the Beat"
 1985: LL Cool J – Radio
 1986: Run-DMC – Raising Hell
 1986: Slayer  – Reign in Blood
 1986: Beastie Boys – Licensed to Ill
 1986: Original Concept – Can You Feel It?
 1986: Junkyard Band  – "The Word" / "Sardines"
 1987: Public Enemy – Yo! Bum Rush the Show (exec.)
 1987: The Cult – Electric
 1987: Run-DMC – "Christmas in Hollis"
 1987: Various – Less than Zero (soundtrack)
 1987: LL Cool J – "Jack the Ripper"
 1988: Public Enemy – It Takes a Nation of Millions to Hold Us Back (exec.)
 1988: Slayer  – South of Heaven
 1988: Danzig – Danzig
 1988: Run-DMC – Tougher Than Leather
 1988: Original Concept – Straight from the Basement of Kooley High! (exec.)
 1989: Masters of Reality – Masters of Reality
 1989: LL Cool J – Walking With a Panther
 1989: Wolfsbane – Live Fast, Die Fast
 1989: Andrew Dice Clay – Dice

1990s 

 1990: Andrew Dice Clay – The Day the Laughter Died
 1990: Danzig – Danzig II: Lucifuge
 1990: Slayer – Seasons in the Abyss
 1990: Geto Boys – The Geto Boys (supervisor)
 1990: Trouble – Trouble
 1990: Wolfsbane – All Hell's Breaking Loose Down at Little Kathy Wilson's Place
 1991: Red Hot Chili Peppers – Blood Sugar Sex Magik
 1991: Slayer – Decade of Aggression
 1991: Andrew Dice Clay – Dice Rules
 1991: The Four Horsemen – Nobody Said It Was Easy
 1991: Dan Baird – Love Songs for the Hearing Impaired
 1992: Sir Mix-a-Lot – Mack Daddy (exec.)
 1992: Trouble – Manic Frustration
 1992: Danzig – Danzig III: How the Gods Kill (exec.)
 1992: The Red Devils – King King
 1992: Andrew Dice Clay – 40 Too Long
 1992: Red Hot Chili Peppers – What Hits!?
 1993: Flipper – American Grafishy (exec.)
 1993: Mick Jagger – Wandering Spirit
 1993: Raging Slab – Dynamite Monster Boogie Concert (exec.)
 1993: The Cult  – The Witch (CD, Single)
 1993: Danzig – Thrall-Demonsweatlive
 1993: Joan Jett and the Blackhearts – Flashback
 1993: Tom Petty and the Heartbreakers – Greatest Hits
 1993: Messiah – 21st Century Jesus (exec.)
 1993: Andrew Dice Clay – The Day the Laughter Died, Part II
 1993: Digital Orgasm – Do It (exec.)
 1993: Barkmarket – Gimmick (exec.)
 1993: Various – Last Action Hero: Music From The Original Motion Picture
 1994: Johnny Cash – American Recordings
 1994: Sir Mix-a-Lot – Chief Boot Knocka (exec.)
 1994: Slayer – Divine Intervention (exec.)
 1994: Danzig – Danzig 4
 1994: Tom Petty – Wildflowers
 1994: Andrew Dice Clay – Dice Live at Madison Square Garden
 1994: Deconstruction – Deconstruction (exec.)
 1994: Milk – Never Dated (exec.)
 1994: Lords of Acid – Voodoo-U (exec.)
 1994: Red Hot Chili Peppers – Live Rare Remix Box
 1994: Red Hot Chili Peppers – The Plasma Shaft
 1995: God Lives Underwater – God Lives Underwater (exec.)
 1995: Nine Inch Nails – Further Down the Spiral
 1995: Red Hot Chili Peppers – One Hot Minute
 1995: AC/DC – Ballbreaker
 1995: God Lives Underwater – Empty (exec.)
 1995: Jazz Lee Alston – Jazz Lee Alston (exec.)
 1996: Slayer – Undisputed Attitude (exec.)
 1996: Tom Petty and the Heartbreakers – She's the One
 1996: Sir Mix-a-Lot – Return of the Bumpasaurus (exec.)
 1996: Donovan – Sutras
 1996: LL Cool J – All World: Greatest Hits
 1996: Johnny Cash – Unchained
 1996: Barkmarket – L. Ron (exec.)
 1996: Raging Slab – Sing Monkey Sing (exec.)
 1996: Kwest tha Madd Ladd – This Is My First Album (exec.)
 1997: System of a Down - Demo Tape 3
 1997: Various – Private Parts: The Album
 1998: Slayer – Diabolus in Musica
 1998: Johnny Cash & Willie Nelson – VH1 Storytellers
 1998: System of a Down – System of a Down
 1998: Lucinda Williams – Car Wheels on a Gravel Road (mixing)
 1998: Various – Chef Aid: The South Park Album
 1998: Sheryl Crow – The Globe Sessions
 1999: Kula Shaker – Peasants, Pigs & Astronauts
 1999: Tom Petty and the Heartbreakers – Echo
 1999: Red Hot Chili Peppers – Californication
 1999: Various – Loud Rocks
 1999: Melanie C – Northern Star
 1999: Mr. Hankey Poo – Mr. Hankey The Christmas Poo
 1999: Various – Mr. Hankey's Christmas Classics (exec.)

2000s 

 2000: Johnny Cash – American III: Solitary Man
 2000: Rage Against the Machine – Renegades
 2000: Eagle-Eye Cherry – Living in the Present Future
 2000: Paloalto – Paloalto
 2001: Saul Williams – Amethyst Rock Star
 2001: American Head Charge – The War of Art
 2001: System of a Down – Toxicity
 2001: Slayer – God Hates Us All (exec.)
 2001: Macy Gray – The Id (exec.)
 2001: Nusrat Fateh Ali Khan – The Final Studio Recordings
 2001: Krishna Das – Breath of the Heart
 2002: Aerosmith – O, Yeah! Ultimate Aerosmith Hits
 2002: Red Hot Chili Peppers – By the Way
 2002: Johnny Cash – American IV: The Man Comes Around
 2002: Audioslave – Audioslave
 2002: System of a Down – Steal This Album!
 2002: Rahat Nusrat Fateh Ali Khan – Rahat
 2003: The Jayhawks – Rainy Day Music (exec.)
 2003: The Mars Volta – De-Loused in the Comatorium
 2003: Limp Bizkit – Results May Vary
 2003: To My Surprise – To My Surprise (exec.)
 2003: Joe Strummer & The Mescaleros – Streetcore
 2003: Jay-Z – "99 Problems"
 2003: Rage Against the Machine – Live at the Grand Olympic Auditorium
 2003: Johnny Cash – Unearthed
 2003: Paloalto – Heroes and Villains
 2003: Krishna Das – Door of Faith
 2003: Manmade God – Manmade God (exec.)
 2004: Johnny Cash – My Mother's Hymn Book
 2004: Slipknot – Vol. 3: (The Subliminal Verses)
 2004: The (International) Noise Conspiracy – Armed Love
 2004: Lil Jon & the East Side Boyz – Crunk Juice
 2004: T.H. White – More Than Before (keys)
 2005: Weezer – Make Believe
 2005: System of a Down – Mezmerize
 2005: Audioslave – Out of Exile
 2005: Shakira – Fijación Oral Vol. 1 (exec.)
 2005: Limp Bizkit – Greatest Hitz
 2005: Neil Diamond – 12 Songs
 2005: Johnny Cash -The Legend of Johnny Cash
 2005: System of a Down – Hypnotize
 2005: Shakira – Oral Fixation Vol. 2 (exec.)
 2006: Red Hot Chili Peppers – Stadium Arcadium
 2006: Dixie Chicks – Taking the Long Way
 2006: Johnny Cash – American V: A Hundred Highways
 2006: Slayer – Christ Illusion (exec.)
 2006: Justin Timberlake – FutureSex/LoveSounds
 2006: God Dethroned – The Toxic Touch
 2006: U2 – U218 Singles
 2006: Johnny Cash The Legend of Johnny Cash Vol. II
 2007: Linkin Park – Minutes to Midnight
 2007: Poison – Poison'd!
 2007: Luna Halo – Luna Halo (exec.)
 2007: Gossip – Live in Liverpool (exec.)
 2007: Dan Wilson – Free Life (exec.)
 2007: Kanye West, Nas, KRS-One, Rakim – "Classic (Better Than I've Ever Been)"
 2007: Vanessa Carlton - "Heroes & Thieves"
 2007: Coheed and Cambria - "Good Apollo, I'm Burning Star IV, Volume Two: No World for Tomorrow"
 2008: Ours – Dancing for the Death of an Imaginary Enemy
 2008: Neil Diamond – Home Before Dark
 2008: Weezer – Weezer (Red Album)
 2008: Jakob Dylan – Seeing Things
 2008: Metallica – Death Magnetic
 2008: The (International) Noise Conspiracy – The Cross of My Calling
 2009: Gossip – Music for Men
 2009: Pete Yorn – Back & Fourth (exec.)
 2009: The Avett Brothers – I and Love and You
 2009: Brandi Carlile – Give Up the Ghost
 2009: Slayer – World Painted Blood (exec.)
 2009: Type O Negative – Bloody Kisses "Top Shelf" edition (2009 re-release) "Summer Breeze" (Rick Rubin Mix)

2010s 

 2010: Johnny Cash – American VI: Ain't No Grave
 2010: Gogol Bordello – Trans-Continental Hustle
 2010: Linkin Park – A Thousand Suns
 2010: Josh Groban – Illuminations
 2010: Kid Rock – Born Free
 2011: Adele – 21
 2011: Red Hot Chili Peppers – I'm with You
 2011: Metallica – Beyond Magnetic
 2011: Linkin Park – A Thousand Suns+
 2012: Linkin Park – Living Things
 2012: Howlin' Rain  – The Russian Wilds (exec.)
 2012: ZZ Top – La Futura
 2012: The Avett Brothers – The Carpenter
 2012: Lana Del Rey – Paradise
 2012: Red Hot Chili Peppers – Rock & Roll Hall of Fame Covers EP
 2013: Linkin Park – Living Things +
 2013: Black Sabbath – 13
 2013: Kanye West – Yeezus (exec.)
 2013: Eminem – The Marshall Mathers LP 2 (exec.)
 2013: Jake Bugg – Shangri La
 2013: Linkin Park – Recharged
 2013: Lady Gaga – Artpop
 2013: The Avett Brothers – Magpie and the Dandelion
 2013: Red Hot Chili Peppers – I'm Beside You
 2014: Jennifer Nettles – That Girl
 2014: Ed Sheeran – X
 2014: Angus & Julia Stone – Angus & Julia Stone
 2014: Damien Rice – My Favourite Faded Fantasy
 2014: Linkin Park & Alec Puro - Mall
 2014: Wu-Tang Clan – A Better Tomorrow
 2014: Yusuf – Tell 'Em I'm Gone
 2015: GoldLink – And After That, We Didn't Talk
 2016: Kanye West – The Life of Pablo
 2016: Various – Star Wars Headspace
 2016: James Blake - The Colour in Anything
 2016: The Avett Brothers – True Sadness
 2017: Billy Corgan  – Ogilala
 2017: Jovanotti  – Oh, vita!
 2017: Eminem – Revival
 2018: Ruen Brothers – 'All My Shades Of Blue'
 2018: The Smashing Pumpkins  – Shiny and Oh So Bright, Vol. 1 / LP: No Past. No Future. No Sun.
 2019: Santana – Africa Speaks
 2019: Jovanotti – Jova Beach Party
 2019: Jovanotti – Lorenzo sulla Luna
 2019: Kae Tempest – The Book of Traps and Lessons
 2019: The Avett Brothers – Closer Than Together

2020s 

 2020: The Strokes – The New Abnormal 
 2021: Imagine Dragons –  Mercury – Act 1
 2021: Santana - "Peace Power", "America for Sale", "Mother Yes"
 2022: Jovanotti - Mediterraneo
 2022: Red Hot Chili Peppers - Unlimited Love
 2022: Imagine Dragons - Mercury - Act 2
 2022: Red Hot Chili Peppers - Return of the Dream Canteen
 2022: Neil Young and Crazy Horse - World Record

References 

Production discographies
Discographies of American artists
Rock music discographies
Pop music discographies
Hip hop discographies
Rick Rubin